Christianity is the second largest religion in Egypt. The history of Egyptian Christianity dates to the Roman era as Alexandria was an early center of Christianity.

Demographics 

The vast majority of Egyptian Christians are Copts who belong to the Coptic Orthodox Church of Alexandria, an Oriental Orthodox Church. As of 2019, Copts in Egypt "are generally understood to make up approximately 10 percent" of the nation's population, with an estimated population of 9.5 million (figure cited in the Wall Street Journal, 2017) or 10 million (figure cited in the Associated Press, 2019). Smaller or larger figures have also been cited, in the range of "somewhere between 6% and 18% of the population," with the Egyptian government estimating lower numbers and the Coptic Orthodox Church estimating much higher numbers. A lack of definite, reliable demographic data renders all estimates uncertain. Outside of Egypt, there are roughly 1 million members of the Coptic Orthodox abroad. Estimates of the percentage of Egyptian Christians who are Coptic Orthodox range from approximately 90% to approximately 95%. The Coptic Orthodox Church of Alexandria is headed by the Pope of Alexandria and Patriarch of All Africa on the Holy See of Saint Mark, currently Pope Tawadros II.

Other than the Coptic Orthodox Church, two other Oriental Orthodox churches have members in Egypt: the Armenian Apostolic and Syriac Orthodox churches.

A minority of Egyptian Christians belong to the Coptic Catholic Church. Approximately 2.5% of Egyptian Christians belong to the Coptic Catholic Church. In 2007, the Annuario Pontificio estimated the total membership of the Coptic Catholic Church to be 161,327, divided into nine eparchies, with nine bishops and 164 parishes. Other particular churches of the worldwide Catholic Church with members in Egypt include the Melkites, Maronites, Syriac Catholics, Armenian Catholics, and Chaldean Catholics.  Most Latin rite Catholics in Egypt are expatriates.

The Greek Orthodox Patriarchate of Alexandria and all Africa is the presence of Eastern Orthodoxy in Egypt. Its membership has steadily declined, and was approximately 110,000 in 1980.

There are a small number of Protestants among Egypt's Christian populations. This includes the Evangelical Church of Egypt (Synod of the Nile), Anglicans (about half expatriates), and the Armenian Evangelical Church.  There are smaller numbers of adherents of the Assemblies of God, Christian Brethren, Free Methodist, Pentecostals, Seventh-Day Adventist, and Churches of Christ, among others. Between 1,000 and 1,500 Jehovah's Witnesses live in Egypt. The Adventist Atlas estimated 852 members of the Seventh-day Adventist Church in Egypt as of 2008.

Scattered among the various churches are a number of converts from Islam to Christianity. A 2015 study estimated that there were 14,000 such believers in Egypt.

Socio-economic 
In Egypt, Copts have relatively higher educational attainment, relatively higher wealth index, and a stronger representation in white collar job types, but limited representation in security agencies. The majority of demographic, socioeconomic and health indicators are similar among Copts and Muslims. Historically; many Copts were accountants, and in 1961 Coptic Christians owned 51% of the Egyptian banks. A Pew Center study about religion and education around the world in 2016, found that around 26% of Egyptian Christians obtain a university degree in institutions of higher education.

According to the scholar Andrea Rugh Copts tend to belong to the educated middle and upper-middle class, and according to scholar Lois Farag "The Copts still played the major role in managing Egypt's state finances. They held 20% of total state capital, 45% of government employment, and 45% of government salarie". According to scholar J. D. Pennington 45% of the medical doctors, 60% of the pharmacists of Egypt were Christians.

A number of Coptic business and land-owning families became very wealthy and influential such as the Egyptian Coptic Christian Sawiris family that owns the Orascom conglomerate, spanning telecommunications, construction, tourism, industries and technology. In 2008, Forbes estimated the family's net worth at $36 billion. According to scholars Maristella Botticini and Zvi Eckstein argue that Copts have relatively higher educational attainment and relatively higher wealth index, due to Coptic Christianity emphasis on literacy and that Coptic Christianity encouraged the accumulation of human capital.

History 

Egyptian Christians believe that the Patriarchate of Alexandria was founded by Mark the Evangelist around AD 33, and Christianity entered Egypt because of The Apostle Mark.

By AD 300 it is clear that Alexandria was one of the great Christian centres. The Christian apologists Clement of Alexandria and Origen both lived part or all of their lives in that city, where they wrote, taught and debated. Anthony the Great, one of the most revered early Christian saints, also hailed from Egypt.

With the Edict of Milan in 313, Constantine I ended the persecution of Christians. Over the course of the 4th century, paganism was suppressed and lost its following, as the poet Palladas bitterly noted. Graffiti at Philae in Upper Egypt proves worship of Isis persisted at its temples into the 5th century.

Alexandria became the centre of the first great schism in the Christian world, between the Arians, named for the Alexandrian priest Arius, and their opponents, represented by Athanasius, who became Archbishop of Alexandria in 326 after the First Council of Nicaea rejected Arius's views. The Arian controversy caused years of riots and rebellions throughout most of the 4th century. In the course of one of these, the great temple of Serapis, the stronghold of paganism, was destroyed. Athanasius was alternately expelled from Alexandria and reinstated as its Archbishop between five and seven times. Another religious development in Egypt was the monasticism of the Desert Fathers, who renounced the material world in order to live a life of poverty in devotion to God.

Under Muslim rule, the Copts were cut off from the mainstream of Christianity and were compelled to adhere to the Pact of Umar covenant. They were assigned to Dhimmi status. Their position improved dramatically under the rule of Muhammad Ali in the early 19th century. He abolished the Jizya (a tax on non-Muslims) and allowed Copts to enroll in the army. Pope Cyril IV, 1854–61, reformed the church and encouraged broader Coptic participation in Egyptian affairs. Khedive Isma'il Pasha, in power 1863–79, further promoted the Copts. He appointed them judges to Egyptian courts and awarded them political rights and representation in government. They flourished in business affairs.

Some Copts participated in the Egyptian national movement for independence and occupied many influential positions. Two significant cultural achievements include the founding of the Coptic Museum in 1910 and the Higher Institute of Coptic Studies in 1954. Some prominent Coptic thinkers from this period are Salama Moussa, Louis Awad and Secretary-General of the Wafd Party Makram Ebeid.

In 1952, Gamal Abdel Nasser led some army officers in a coup d'état against King Farouk, which overthrew the Kingdom of Egypt and established a republic. Nasser's mainstream policy was pan-Arab nationalism and socialism. The Copts were severely affected by Nasser's nationalization policies, though they represented about 10–20% of the population. In addition, Nasser's pan-Arab policies undermined the Copts' strong attachment to and sense of identity about their Egyptian pre-Arab, and certainly non-Arab identity which resulted in permits to construct churches to be delayed along with Christian religious courts to be closed.

Pharaonism 

Many Coptic intellectuals hold to "Pharaonism," which states that Coptic culture is largely derived from pre-Christian, Pharaonic culture, and is not indebted to Greece. It gives the Copts a claim to a deep heritage in Egyptian history and culture. Pharaonism was widely held by Coptic scholars in the early 20th century. Most scholars today see Pharaonism as a late development shaped primarily by western Orientalism, and doubt its validity.

Persecution and discrimination 

Religious freedom in Egypt is hampered to varying degrees by discriminatory and restrictive government policies. Coptic Christians, being the largest religious minority in Egypt, are also negatively affected. Copts have faced increasing marginalization after the 1952 coup d'état led by the Free Officers Movement, a group of army officers led by Mohammed Naguib and Gamal Abdel Nasser. Until recently, Christians were required to obtain presidential approval for even minor repairs in churches. Although the law was eased in 2005 by handing down the authority of approval to the governors, Copts continue to face many obstacles and restrictions in building new churches. These restrictions do not apply for building mosques, although in August 2017, the Parliament of Egypt removed the legal restrictions that limited the construction of new churches.

In 2006, one person attacked three churches in Alexandria, killing one person and injuring 5–16. The attacker was not linked to any organisation and described as "psychologically disturbed" by the Ministry of Interior. In May 2010, The Wall Street Journal reported increasing waves of mob attacks by Muslims against ethnic Copts. Despite frantic calls for help, the police typically arrived after the violence was over. The police also coerced the Copts to accept "reconciliation" with their attackers to avoid prosecuting them, with no Muslims convicted for any of the attacks. In Marsa Matrouh, a Bedouin mob of 3,000 Muslims tried to attack the city's Coptic population, with 400 Copts having to barricade themselves in their church while the mob destroyed 18 homes, 23 shops, and 16 cars.

Members of U.S. Congress have expressed concern about "human trafficking" of Coptic women and girls who are victims of abductions, forced conversion to Islam, sexual exploitation, and forced marriage to Muslim men.

Boutros Boutros-Ghali is a Copt who served as Egypt's foreign minister under President Anwar Sadat. Today, only two Copts are on Egypt's governmental cabinet: Finance Minister Youssef Boutros Ghali and Environment Minister Magued George. There is also currently one Coptic governor out of 25, that of the upper Egyptian governorate of Qena, and the first Coptic governor in a few decades. In addition, Naguib Sawiris, an extremely successful businessman and one of the world's 100 wealthiest people, is a Copt. In 2002, under the Mubarak government, Coptic Christmas (January 7) was recognized as an official holiday. However, many Copts continue to complain of being minimally represented in law enforcement, state security, and public office, and of being discriminated against in the workforce on the basis of their religion.

While freedom of religion is guaranteed by the Egyptian constitution, according to Human Rights Watch, "Egyptians are able to convert to Islam generally without difficulty, but Muslims who convert to Christianity face difficulties in getting new identity papers and some have been arrested for allegedly forging such documents." The Coptic community, however, takes pains to prevent conversions from Christianity to Islam due to the ease with which Christians can often become Muslim. Public officials, being conservative themselves, intensify the complexity of the legal procedures required to recognize the religion change as required by law. Security agencies will sometimes claim that such conversions from Islam to Christianity (or occasionally vice versa) may stir social unrest, and thereby justify themselves in wrongfully detaining the subjects, insisting that they are simply taking steps to prevent likely social troubles from happening. In 2007, a Cairo administrative court denied 45 citizens the right to obtain identity papers documenting their reversion to Christianity after converting to Islam. However, in February 2008 the Supreme Administrative Court overturned the decision, allowing 12 citizens who had reverted to Christianity to re-list their religion on identity cards, but they will specify that they had adopted Islam for a brief period of time.

In August 2013, following the 3 July 2013 Coup and clashes between the military and Morsi supporters, there were widespread attacks on Coptic churches and institutions in Egypt by Sunni Muslims.
 According to at least one Egyptian scholar (Samuel Tadros), the attacks are the worst violence against the Coptic Church since the 14th century.

USA Today reported that "forty churches have been looted and torched, while 23 others have been attacked and heavily damaged". The Facebook page of the Muslim Brotherhood's Freedom and Justice Party was "rife with false accusations meant to foment hatred against Copts", according to journalist Kirsten Powers. The Party's page claimed that the Coptic Church had declared "war against Islam and Muslims" and that "The Pope of the Church is involved in the removal of the first elected Islamist president. The Pope of the Church alleges Islamic Sharia is backwards, stubborn, and reactionary." On August 15, nine Egyptian human rights groups under the umbrella group "Egyptian Initiative for Personal Rights", released a statement saying, In December … Brotherhood leaders began fomenting anti-Christian sectarian incitement. The anti-Coptic incitement and threats continued unabated up to the demonstrations of June 30 and, with the removal of President Morsi … morphed into sectarian violence, which was sanctioned by … the continued anti-Coptic rhetoric heard from the group's leaders on the stage … throughout the sit-in.

On February 25, 2016, an Egyptian court convicted four Coptic Christian teenagers for contempt of Islam, after they appeared in a video mocking Muslim prayers.

See also 
 Religion in Egypt
 Coptic Orthodox Church
 Catholic Church in Egypt
 Protestantism in Egypt
 List of Coptic Orthodox churches in Egypt
 Copts
 Christianity in Sohag Governorate

Notes

References

Sources

External links 
 European Centre for Law and Justice (2011): The Persecution of Oriental Christians, what answer from Europe?